RFNS Savenaca (401) is a , being built in Australia for Fiji's Navy. She will replace , a Pacific Forum patrol vessel provided by Australia in 1994.  She will be the seventh vessel of the class to be completed, and the second of two to be delivered to Fiji.  She will be commissioned in March or April of 2020.

Design

Australia provided 22 Pacific Forum patrol vessels to its smaller neighbours in the Pacific Forum after the United Nations Convention on the Law of the Sea provided maritime nations with  exclusive economic zone.  Those vessels were delivered in the late 1980s and early 1990s, and were designed for a service life of approximately 30 years. Australia designed the Guardian class as a slightly larger and more capable replacement.

Like the Pacific Forum vessels the Guardian-class vessels are built using commercial off the shelf components, to make it easier for the vessels to be maintained in small, isolated shipyards.

Operational career

Savenaca was turned over to the Royal Fiji Naval Service, at Austal's Henderson factory, on March 6, 2020.
Attending the handover ceremony were Voreqe Bainimarama, Prime Minister of Fiji, Inia Seruiratu, Minister of Defence, Melissa Price, Minister for Defence Industry, and Rear Admiral Viliame Naupoto and Captain Humphrey Tawake, of the Fiji Navy.

Savenaca arrived in Walu Bay on April 28, 2020, where she was greeted by Minister of Defence Inia Seruiratu.

In May, 2020, Savenaca was dispatched with humanitarian aid to areas stricken with the Covid 19 virus.  Australia had helped by flying in supplies, including a large portable generator.

Namesake

The vessel is named after Savenaca Naulumatua, a Fiji sailor who died serving aboard , during the Battle of Kolombangara.

References 

Guardian class patrol vessels
Ships built by Austal
2020 ships
Ships of the Fijian Navy